Jilab (also Romanized as Jīlāb; also known as Ḩīlāb) is a village in Oshtorjan Rural District, in the Central District of Falavarjan County, Isfahan Province, Iran. At the 2006 census, its population was 388, in 88 families.

References 

Populated places in Falavarjan County